The Beast Quake was a National Football League (NFL) touchdown scored by Seattle Seahawks running back Marshawn Lynch against the New Orleans Saints during a 2010 NFC Wild Card playoff game. Occurring in the fourth quarter while Seattle was up by four points, Lynch rushed for 67 yards and broke nine tackles to score a touchdown, which secured the Seahawks' eventual 41–36 victory. The play's name derives from Lynch's nickname "Beast Mode" and the subsequent celebration of Seahawks fans registering on a nearby seismograph.

Background

The Saints came into the game as the 5th-seeded wild card in the NFC. Although they were the Super Bowl XLIV defending champions, and had an 11–5 record for the season, they had finished second in the NFC South division behind the 13–3 Atlanta Falcons. In contrast, the Seahawks had won the NFC West division with only a 7–9 record, making them the first team to reach the NFL playoffs with a losing record through a full season. Additionally, the Seahawks ranked just 27th out 32 teams in the NFL in point differential, and were 30th in yard differential. The two teams had previously met during Week 11 of the regular season in New Orleans, with the Saints winning handily, 34–19, causing many to speculate that the rematch would be similarly lopsided.

Two early Seahawks miscues enabled the Saints to build a 10-point lead. First, Olindo Mare kicked the opening kickoff out of bounds, giving New Orleans the ball at their 40-yard line. New Orleans then drove to the Seahawks' 8-yard line, but had to settle for a Garrett Hartley field goal after Reggie Bush dropped a pass on third down that could have kept the drive going. Then three plays into the Seahawks' drive, Matt Hasselbeck's pass went through the hands of receiver Benjamin Obomanu and into the arms of defensive back Jabari Greer, who returned the interception 10 yards to the Seattle 35. New Orleans subsequently drove 35 yards in nine plays, aided by a third down pass interference penalty on Walter Thurmond in the end zone, and scored on Drew Brees' 1-yard touchdown pass to fullback Heath Evans, giving them a 10–0 lead.

Seattle fullback Michael Robinson returned Hartley's short kickoff 18 yards to the 43-yard line, and the Seahawks struck back with a 57-yard drive that ended with a Hasselbeck 11-yard touchdown pass to tight end John Carlson. The Saints countered as Brees completed 4 of 5 passes for 53 yards on an 83-yard drive that ended with a 5-yard touchdown run by Julius Jones, who had been cut by Seattle early in the season, to again give the Saints a ten-point lead. But Hasselbeck led the Seahawks right back on a 70-yard scoring drive, featuring a 39-yard reception by tight end Cameron Morrah. On the next play, Hasselbeck threw his second touchdown pass to Carlson, cutting the score to 17–14. After an exchange of punts, Jones lost a fumble while being tackled by Raheem Brock that Seattle linebacker David Hawthorne recovered on the Saints' 18-yard line, setting up a 29-yard field goal by Mare to tie the game.

With 1:15 left in the second quarter, Hasselbeck launched a 45-yard touchdown pass to Brandon Stokley, giving Seattle their first lead of the game at 24–17. But a 40-yard reception by Devery Henderson helped the Saints drive to the Seattle 3-yard line where Hartley made his second field goal to cut the score to 24–20 as time expired in the half. This was only the second playoff game in which both teams scored at least 20 points in the first two quarters.

The Seahawks increased their lead to 31–20 on their opening drive of the second half, as Hasselbeck threw an 18-yard completion to Obomanu and finished the drive with a 38-yard touchdown pass to Mike Williams.  Then after forcing a punt, Mare kicked a 39-yard field goal to make the score 34–20 with 9:54 left in the quarter.  The Seahawks got a chance to build a three-score lead after stopping Jones for no gain on fourth down and 1 on the Saints' 37-yard line, but they could only gain a few yards with their next drive, and a delay of game penalty on fourth down pushed them out of field goal range.

New Orleans got the ball back at their 13-yard line following Jon Ryan's punt, and mounted an 83-yard drive that ended with Jones' second touchdown run of the game, making the score 34–27 with 13:11 left in regulation. Then they forced a three-and-out and got the ball back with good field position on their 44-yard line with Lance Moore's 8-yard punt return. On the second play of their ensuing drive, Brees threw a short pass to Jones, who took it 33 yards to the Seattle 23.  But several plays later, Seattle's defense halted the drive at the 3-yard line, where the Saints settled for Hartley's third field goal to cut the score to 34–30. After an exchange of punts, Seattle got the ball with 4:20 left in the game. On the first play of the drive, Lynch was stuffed for no gain. The Seahawks faced a 2nd and 10 at their own 33 yard line, protecting a 4-point lead with 3:38 remaining.

The run

With their base offense on the field, the Seahawks called "17 Power", a power run, for the first time in the game. Seattle lined up in an I formation with tight end Carlson on the left and fullback Michael Robinson offset to the left. New Orleans lined up in a 2–5 "under" front with strong safety Roman Harper crowding the line of scrimmage, putting eight defenders near the box. Hasselbeck motioned wide receiver Ben Obomanu from the right to the left. At the snap, Seattle right guard Mike Gibson also pulled to the left.

Seattle had called zone runs for most of the game, but this call required man-on-man blocking. Carlson was assigned to block New Orleans linebacker Jo-Lonn Dunbar, while left tackle Russell Okung was assigned to defensive end Will Smith and Obomanu to Harper. Left guard Tyler Polumbus and center Chris Spencer were to team up on defensive tackle Remi Ayodele and, ideally, push past him to block weak-side linebacker Scott Shanle. Robinson would push ahead and block New Orleans middle linebacker Jonathan Vilma, and Gibson would be free to lead Lynch and deal with any unblocked defenders. Meanwhile, on the right side of the formation, right tackle Sean Locklear would try to cut off defensive tackle Sedrick Ellis, and defensive end Alex Brown would be left unblocked on the outside.

As the play actually developed, New Orleans was effective in frustrating the blocking scheme. Dunbar pushed Carlson back and prevented Gibson from reaching the point of attack. Polumbus and Spencer were able to turn Ayodele away, but neither was able to get off their block and challenge Shanle, who correctly read the pulling guard and filled the gap. Lynch recalled, "So I see the guard coming around, and in my head, I'm thinking, backside A gap. But for some reason, it carried me to the front side." Instead of rushing behind Gibson, Lynch rushed between Gibson and Robinson, finding an unblocked Shanle at the line of scrimmage. If Shanle had completed the tackle here, he would have limited Lynch to a 2-yard gain.

Instead, Lynch bounced away from Shanle's tackle, while also running through the grasp of Ellis and Will Smith. As Lynch broke through the line, Ayodele and Saints safety Darren Sharper simultaneously dove to pull Lynch down as he ran past them, but were unsuccessful. Jabari Greer then caught up with Lynch from behind and tried to wrap him up, but could not hang on. Lynch then angled toward the right sideline, pursued by Tracy Porter, who was stiff armed to the ground by Lynch. Brown lunged for Lynch's heels, but fell short. Finally, Harper, being blocked by Polumbus, attempted one last diving tackle inside the 5 yard line. Already celebrating, Lynch leapt backwards into the endzone, with his right arm holding the ball aloft and his left hand grabbing his crotch, for the touchdown.

Aftermath

With 1:52 left, Brees struck back with a 6-yard touchdown pass to Henderson, but the 2-point conversion failed, keeping the score at 41–36. Then Carlson sealed the victory by recovering Hartley's onside kick attempt, enabling Seattle to run out the clock.

Brees finished with 39 of 60 completions for 404 yards and two touchdowns. His 39 completions set a postseason record. Jones, who became the first player ever to score a touchdown in the postseason against a team that had cut him in the regular season, rushed for 59 yards and two touchdowns while also catching 6 passes for 61 yards. Hasselbeck completed 22 of 35 passes for 271 yards and 4 touchdowns with 1 interception. Lynch added 131 rushing yards and a touchdown for Seattle, who had not had a 100-yard rusher in any of their regular season games.

With the win, not only did the Seahawks improve their overall record to 8–9, but they became the first sub-.500 team in NFL history to win a playoff game as well as dethroning the defending champion Saints from further playoff contention. The play also served as something of a resurrection of Lynch's career, who had been traded to Seattle midseason from the Buffalo Bills after struggling there. He rushed for over 1,000 yards for the next four seasons, culminating in back-to-back Super Bowls (winning one). However, these 2010 Seahawks lost the next week 35-24 to the second-seeded Chicago Bears.

It was later determined that crowd activity and noise was so great during Lynch's game-clinching touchdown run that a nearby Pacific Northwest Seismic Network station registered a small tremor, M=2 located at Qwest Field.  With the win, the Seahawks had a 6–3 record at home for the season.

In 2012, the NFL revealed that the Saints put bounties on several Seahawks players during this game, including Hasselbeck, Lynch, and Williams.

Beast Mode Run 2.0
During a 2014 game against the  Arizona Cardinals on the road, Lynch had a similar run, beating several would-be tacklers on his way to a career-long 79-yard touchdown.

Box score

Starting lineups

Officials 
Referee: Walt Coleman (#65)
Umpire: Paul King (#121)
Head Linesman: Greg Bradley (#98)
Line Judge: Mark Steinkerchner (#84)
Field Judge: Terry Brown (#43)
Side Judge: Michael Banks (#72)
Back Judge: Greg Steed (#12)

See also 
 Earthquake Game, a 1988 college football game in which crowd reactions also registered on a seismograph.

Further reading

References

External links
 Pro Football Reference box score
 NFL Videos
 Replay with NBC TV announcers
 Replay with Seattle radio announcers
 Anatomy of a Play by Solomon Wilcots
 NFL Films Presents: Beast mode
 Seahawks Postgame Press Conference
 Saints Postgame Press Conference
 

2010 National Football League season
American football incidents
National Football League playoff games
New Orleans Saints postseason
Seattle Seahawks postseason
January 2011 sports events in the United States
2011 in sports in Washington (state)
2011 in Seattle